Cuba and the Philippines were both former Spanish colonies. Spanish rule on both countries was ended by the victory of the United States in the Spanish–American War as provisions of the Treaty of Paris giving Cuba independence and the Philippines becoming a new possession of the United States.

History

Early history
Cuba and the Philippines have been in existence for centuries. In the early 16th century, Filipinos reached Cuba via the Manila-Acapulco Galleon that linked New Spain (Mexico) to the Orient. Filipinos who were brought by the Spaniards to Cuba were altar boys, catechism leaders, and church workers. Pinar del Río is famous for their cigars, which were brought over from the Philippines by the Spanish because it was much closer to Europe and easier to oversee. Afterwards, some Filipinos moved to Havana's big Barrio Chino or Chinatown. The Philippines and Cuba were both dominated by Spain Crown for several centuries, which ended at the turn of the 19th century with Spain's defeat by the United States. Both countries fell under American rule after Spain ceded Puerto Rico, Philippines, and Cuba to the United States for twenty million US dollars. Later on, Cuba gained its Independence while the Philippines continued to be under the American rule. On July 14, 1946, the Philippines gained its independence. Formal diplomatic relations between the Philippines and Cuba were also established in July 1946.

Contemporary era
Diplomatic relations between Cuba and the Philippines were disrupted in 1961. Relations were formally restored with the signing of a joint statement by former Prime Minister Fidel Castro and former Philippine First Lady Imelda Marcos in Havana on August 26, 1975.

The Philippines, despite being a long-time of ally of the United States, which has currently unfavorable relations with Cuba, has voted against the United States embargo against Cuba in UN General Assembly resolutions.

In July 2011, both countries celebrated their 65th year of diplomatic relations.

On October 31, 2012, the Philippine government closed its embassy in Havana along with three other embassies in Stockholm, Sweden, Bucharest, Romania, Helsinki, Finland, and the consulate in Saipan. The closure was part of the Philippines' Department of Foreign Affairs austerity measures and restructuring plan. The Philippines, however, assured the closing of its embassy in Cuba will not affect the diplomatic relations of the two countries. Presidential Spokesperson Edwin Lacierda said in a news briefing, "There will be no effect, closing down of Consular offices is internal to us, so there is no effect on them (concerned countries), as long as we have presence there... we [will] have diplomatic relations. The diplomatic relations is not diminished by the cutting down of Consular offices in their countries."

In June 2013, former Cuban ambassador to the Philippines Jorge Rey Jiménez announced that they will close their embassy in Makati citing financial difficulties brought by the global economic crisis and the United States’ embargo. All consular and diplomatic relations with the Philippines were then assumed by the Cuban Embassy in Kuala Lumpur.

Diplomatic missions
The Cuban embassy in Kuala Lumpur, Malaysia, is accredited to the Philippines, while Cuba is represented through the Philippine embassy in Mexico City, Mexico.

Socio-cultural relations
Cuba and Philippines share socio-cultural similarities mostly due to their Hispanic heritage brought by Spanish colonial rule for more than three hundred years. Both countries are predominantly Catholics, and celebrate town fiestas. The two countries also share the concept of "Padre de Familia" where the father heads the family and the mother, along the children, recognizes the father's decision. Spanish names and family names are also apparent among the two countries.

People
Filipino Cubans include the Azcarraga Fessner family, whose patriarch was Marcelo de Azcarraga y Palmero, the first Prime Minister of Spain with Indian blood, whose mother was a Filipina from the Lizarraga and Palmero families. Cuban Filipinos include Lieutenant Gabriel Badelly Méndez a Cuban member of the Philippine army and Vicente Catalan, Chief Admiral of the Philippine Revolutionary Navy and a Cuban of Criollo descent.

The Pinar del Rio Province in Cuba, was formerly called "Nueva Filipinas" in the 18th century due to mass immigration of Filipinos and other Asians to the area to work in the region's tobacco industry. Asians immigrated to Cuba through the Manila-Acapulco galleon trade route and they were known generally known as "Chinos Manila".

References

External links
 Cuba diplomatic relations
 Cuban relations to Philippines

 
Philippines
Bilateral relations of the Philippines